The Usk Ferry is a cable ferry across the Skeena River in British Columbia, Canada.

Technically, the ferry is a reaction ferry, which is propelled by the current of the water. An overhead cable is suspended from towers anchored on either bank of the river, and a "traveler" is installed on the cable. The ferry is attached to the traveler by a bridle cable. To operate the ferry, either the right or left bridle cable is tightened to angle the pontoons into the current, causing the force of the current to move the ferry across the river.

The ferry operates under contract to the British Columbia Ministry of Transportation, is free of tolls, and runs on demand between 0645 and 2315with some gaps in service. It carries a maximum of 2 cars and 12 passengers at a time. At times of low water, or ice in the river, the ferry is replaced by an aerial tramway that carries passengers only.

See also

Adams Lake Cable Ferry
Arrow Park Ferry
Barnston Island Ferry
Big Bar Ferry
Francois Lake Ferry
Glade Cable Ferry
Kootenay Lake Ferry
Harrop Ferry
Little Fort Ferry
McLure Ferry
Needles Ferry
Upper Arrow Lake Ferry

References

Ferries of British Columbia
Cable ferries in Canada